The Fighting Gringo is a 1917 American silent Western film directed by Fred Kelsey and featuring Harry Carey.  Its survival status is unknown.

Cast
 Harry Carey as William 'Red' Saunders
 Claire Du Brey as May Smith
 George Webb as Arthur Saxon
 Rex De Rosselli as Ramon Orinez
 T. D. Crittenden as Belknap
 Tote Du Crow as Enrique
 William Steele as Jim (as Bill Gettinger)
 Vester Pegg as Pedro (as Vesta Pegg)

See also
 List of American films of 1917
 Harry Carey filmography
 The Fighting Gringo (1939 film)

References

External links

 

1917 films
1917 short films
1917 Western (genre) films
American silent short films
American black-and-white films
Films directed by Fred Kelsey
Silent American Western (genre) films
Universal Pictures films
1910s American films
1910s English-language films